Sebastian Stefaniszin (born July 22, 1987) is a German former professional ice hockey goaltender, who last played with Dresdner Eislöwen of the DEL2. He also played in the Deutsche Eishockey Liga (DEL).

Playing career
Stefaniszin was drafted 98th overall in the 2007 NHL Entry Draft by the Anaheim Ducks.

Unsigned from the Ducks, Stefaniszin remained in Europe and he continued to play in the Deutsche Eishockey Liga for Eisbären Berlin. He later appeared with the Iserlohn Roosters. Before joining the Thomas Sabo Ice Tigers.

On June 19, 2014, Stefaniszin agreed to return to the DEL in signing a one-year contract with Kölner Haie.

References

External links

1987 births
Anaheim Ducks draft picks
Dresdner Eislöwen players
Eisbären Berlin players
Essen Mosquitoes players
EV Landshut players
Füchse Duisburg players
German ice hockey goaltenders
Graz 99ers players
Hamburg Freezers players
Ice hockey people from Berlin
Iserlohn Roosters players
Kölner Haie players
Living people
Thomas Sabo Ice Tigers players
Vienna Capitals players